Owen Alan Lunt (born 2 September 2004) is an English professional footballer who plays as a midfielder for Crewe Alexandra.

Having come through the Crewe Alexandra academy system, Lunt made his debut for the club as a second-year scholar in their EFL Trophy game against Leeds United U21s on 1 November 2022, playing the final 18 minutes as a substitute for Lachlan Brook.

Personal life
Lunt is the nephew of former Crewe midfielder and current player development manager Kenny Lunt.

Career statistics

References

Living people
English footballers
English Football League players
Crewe Alexandra F.C. players
2004 births
Association football midfielders